The 1933–36 Nordic Football Championship was the third Nordic Football Championship staged. Four Nordic countries participated, Denmark, Finland, Norway and Sweden. The tournament was arranged by the Football Association of Norway. The trophy was named the Nordiske Pokal (Nordic Trophy). A total of 24 matches were played with 104 goals scored giving an average of 4.33 goals per match.

Results

1933

1934

1935

1936

Table

Winner

Statistics

Goalscorers

See also
Balkan CupBaltic CupCentral European International CupMediterranean Cup

References

External links 
Nordic Championships 1933-36 at RSSSF

1933-36
1933–34 in European football
1934–35 in European football
1935–36 in European football
1936–37 in European football
1933–34 in Swedish football
1934–35 in Swedish football
1935–36 in Swedish football
1936–37 in Swedish football
1933–34 in Danish football
1934–35 in Danish football
1935–36 in Danish football
1936–37 in Danish football
1933 in Norwegian football
1934 in Norwegian football
1935 in Norwegian football
1936 in Norwegian football
1933 in Finnish football
1934 in Finnish football
1935 in Finnish football
1936 in Finnish football